Vishnuprayag is one of the Panch Prayag (five confluences) of Alaknanda River, and lies at the confluence of Alaknanda River and Dhauliganga River, in Chamoli district in the Indian state of Uttarakhand.
 Vishnuprayag derives its name from Vishnu, According to Hindu scriptures, it is the place where Sage Narada meditated, after which  Vishnu appeared before him. It is near to Kagbhusandi Lake.

Geography
Its original name is Vishnuprayāg.
It has an average elevation of 1,372 metres.

{Panch Prayag}

Path
The Alaknanda River, which originates in the eastern slopes of the glacier fields of Chaukhamba, is joined by the Saraswati River near Mana village and then flows in front of the Badrinath temple. It then meets the Dhauli Ganga River, which originates from the Niti Pass, to form the Vishnuprayag. This stretch of the Alaknanda River is called the Vishnu Ganga. According to legend, the sage Narada offered worship to god Vishnu at this confluence. An octagonal shaped temple located near the confluence is dated to 1889 and is credited to the Maharani of Indore, Ahalyabai. A stairway from this temple leads to the Prayag.

Places nearby

Vishnuprayag Hydro Electricity Project
This project is owned by Jaypee Industries and is around 12 km in length. The project produces 400MW. The project is located at Hanuman Chatti near Vishnuprayag.

The Badrinath temple is the main attraction in the town. According to legend, Shankara discovered a black stone image of Lord Badrinarayan made of Saligram stone in the Alaknanda River. He originally enshrined it in a cave near the Tapt Kund hot springs.[6][7] In the 16th century, the King of Garhwal moved the murti to the present temple.[6] The temple is approximately 50 ft (15 m) tall with a small cupola on top, covered with a gilt roof. The facade is built of stone, with arched windows. A broad stairway leads up to a tall arched gateway, which is the main entrance. The architecture resembles a Buddhist vihara (temple), with the brightly painted facade also more typical of Buddhist temples.[8] Just inside is the mandapa, a large pillared hall that leads to the garbha grha, or main shrine area. The walls and pillars of the mandapa are covered with intricate carvings

Hanuman Chatti
Hanuman Chatti is a temple situated a few kilometers ahead of Vishnuprayag that is dedicated to the god Hanuman.

See also
 Panch Prayag
 Nandaprayag
 Rudraprayag
 Devprayag
 Karnaprayag
 List of hydroelectric power station failures

References

Cities and towns in Chamoli district
Abhimana temples of Vishnu

bpy:নন্দ প্রয়াগ